The Modena Triptych is 1568 triptych (three panel painting) by the artist El Greco, who was also known as Doménikos Theotokópoulos.

This portable altarpiece is painted on both sides and has an Italian Renaissance frame. The front depicts the Adoration of the Shepherds, a Christian knight being crowned by Christ in glory, and the Baptism of Jesus. The back panels show the Annunciation to Mary, Mount Sinai, and Adam and Eve. The back panel shows pilgrims on the way to the Saint Catherine's Monastery in Egypt as if on their way to Heaven.

Sources

Paintings by El Greco
Paintings depicting Adam and Eve
Paintings depicting the Annunciation
Paintings depicting Jesus
Paintings of the Baptism of Christ
1560s paintings
Triptychs
Paintings in the collection of the Galleria Estense
Modena
Cretan Renaissance paintings